Perfect Game Recording Co. is a record label with no genre specificity based in New York City. The label is in the EastWest family of labels.

Current Artists
 The Lordz
 Ill Bill

See also 
 List of record labels

External links
 The Lordz official site

American record labels